Vella Flat is a coastal flat to the south of Lake Cole in the northwest part of Black Island, Ross Archipelago. It was named by the Advisory Committee on Antarctic Names (US-ACAN) (1999) after Professor Paul Vella, Department of Geology, Victoria University of Wellington, who made a reconnaissance survey of Brown Peninsula and Black Island stratigraphy with the Victoria University of Wellington Antarctic Expedition (VUWAE), 1964–65.

Plains of Antarctica
Landforms of the Ross Dependency
Black Island (Ross Archipelago)